The Arbeter-ring in Yisroel – Brith Haavoda ( -  lit., The Labor Alliance) was the Israeli branch of the International Jewish Labor Bund, launched in 1951 and disbanded in 2019.

Staff

Secretaries
Its first secretary was Isachar (Oskar) Artuski (birth name: Eichenbaum/Aykhenboym, 1903 or 1908-1971), a former Polish Communist who had joined the Bund in 1935. He was also the founder and first editor of Lebns Fragn (see below) and a correspondent of an American Trotskyist magazine “Labor Action”.

Since 2006 the present secretary has been Josef Fraind, who immigrated to Israel from Warsaw in 1952.

Other
Bella Bryks-Klein has been the Director of Cultural Events and Library since January 2007 to the present.

Electoral participation
The Israeli Bund chapter presented a list at the 1959 Knesset election, under the name Socialist Union, but failed to win a seat with only 1,322 votes (0.1%).

Lebns Fragn
The Israeli Bundist magazine was Lebns Fragn (Life questions), founded in May 1951 by Isachar Artuski, the responsible editor was Ben-Zion "Bentsl" Tsalevitsh (1883-1967), who moved to Mandatory Palestine in 1922. After Artuski's death in November 1971, Yitskhok Luden became its editor. Ceased publication in 2014.

Sources

Iconography
a scanned front page of Lebns Fragn

Filmography
Bundists in Israel (Bundaiim), 2007 (director: Eran Turbiner), see the synopsis page on the website bundism.net and the director's short bio on the same site
 "The Bund: Utopia For Real", 1998(?) (Director: Izzy Abrahami), "From the members of the Israeli Bund club in Tel Aviv we hear of the oppression the Bundists have suffered in Zionist Israel..." For more information

Bundism
Jewish anti-Zionism in Israel
Jewish anti-Zionist organizations
Secular Jewish culture in Israel
Socialism in Israel
Yiddish culture in Tel Aviv
1951 establishments in Israel
2019 disestablishments in Israel